Hattachi-ike Dam (初立池) is an earthfill dam located in Aichi Prefecture in Japan. The dam is used for irrigation. The catchment area of the dam is 0.7 km2. The dam impounds about 22  ha of land when full and can store 1700 thousand cubic meters of water. The construction of the dam was completed in 1969.

References

Dams in Aichi Prefecture
1969 establishments in Japan